Composition for Victory Day is a Russian film in 1998. The director is Sergei Ursuliak.    Oleg Yefremov's the last role.

Plot
They had not seen for twenty-five years the crew of heroic fighters, three front-line friends. Life they have developed in different ways: one convinced Communist, not missing a single red rally, the other successful Vice-Chairman of the veterans non-poor fund, the third emigrant, who lost his sight in old age and came home to participate in the Victory Parade.

They argue passionately with each other about the reasons for the ills and misfortunes of today. But when one of them gets into trouble, his friends are ready to do anything to save his comrade.

Cast
 Oleg Yefremov as Dmitry Kilovatov
 Vyacheslav Tikhonov as Lev Morgulis
 Mikhail Ulyanov as Ivan Dyakov
 Zinaida Sharko as Nina
 Vladimir Kashpur as Stepanyuk 
 Vladimir Mashkov as Sasha, Morgulis' s son
 Sergei Makovetsky as investigator Chechevikin
 Vladimir Ilyin as Zvyagin
 Vladimir Menshov as general
 Sergei Nikonenko as Nechyporenko, head of the airport
 Gennady Nazarov as Vova
 Roman Madyanov as Chubais
 Konstantin Lavronenko as Kostya
 Lyubov Sokolova as Anya

Awards and nominations
 Nika Award: Zinaida Sharko (Best Supporting Actor or Actress) – nom
 Russian Guild of Film Critics:  Mikhail Ulyanov (Best Actor), Mikael Tariverdiev (Best Score)  – nom
 Kinotavr: Sergei Ursuliak (Grand Prize) – nom

References

External links
 

Russian crime drama films
Films about aircraft hijackings
Gorky Film Studio films
1998 crime drama films
1998 films
Films set in Moscow
Films shot in Moscow